Possession may refer to:

Law 
Dependent territory, an area of land over which another country exercises sovereignty, but which does not have the full right of participation in that country's governance
Drug possession, a crime
Ownership
Personal property, physical possessions belonging to a person
Possession (law), exclusive practical control of a thing, in the context of the legal implications of that control
Title (property)

Linguistics
 Inalienable possession, relationship between two objects that is irreversible
 Possession (linguistics), grammatically expressed relationship such as control-of and ownership

Supernatural possession
 Spirit possession, psychokinetic control of the behavior of a living thing or natural object by a spiritual being. Also psychokinetic control of a person by the Devil or other malevolent spirit.

Places
 La Possession, French commune on the Indian Ocean island of Réunion
 Possession Island (disambiguation), various islands including a French island in the Indian Ocean and other three islands
 Possession Point, former land form, Hong Kong 
 Possession Sound, Washington state
 Possession Street, Hong Kong

Arts and entertainment

Literature
 Possession (Byatt novel), a 1990 novel by A. S. Byatt
 Possession (Johnson novel), a trilogy released from 2011-2014 by Elana Johnson
 Possession (Markandaya novel), a 1963 novel by Kamala Markandaya
 Possession (play), a play by Lyle Kessler
 The Possession, a 2002 novel by Annie Ernaux

Film and television
 Possession (1919 film), a British silent romance
 Possession (1922 film), a British-French silent drama
 Possession (1981 film), a horror starring Sam Neill, Isabelle Adjani and directed by Andrzej Zulawski
 Possession (2002 film), adaptation of the A. S. Byatt novel of the same name starring Aaron Eckhart and Gwyneth Paltrow
 Possession (2009 film), starring Sarah Michelle Gellar and Lee Pace
 Possession (upcoming film), a South Korean mystery thriller
 Possession (TV series), 1985 Australian series
 The Possession (film), a 2012 horror film starring Natasha Calis, Jeffrey Dean Morgan, Matisyahu and Kyra Sedgwick
 Possessor (film), a 2020 body horror film by Brandon Cronenberg
Ninjago: Possession, the fifth season in the Ninjago: Masters of Spinjitzu computer-animated television series

Music
 Possession (Benea Reach album), 2013
 Possession (GOD album), 1992
 Possession (Joywave album), 2020
 Possession (Lily Afshar album), 2002
 "Possession" (Kuuro song), 2017
 "Possession" (Iron Butterfly song), 1967
 "Possession" (Sarah McLachlan song), 1993
 "Possession", a song by Bad English from Bad English, 1989
 "Possession", a song by Danzig from Danzig, 1988
 "Possession", a song by Mandaryna from Mandarynkowy sen, 2005
 "Possession", a song by The Sisters of Mercy from First and Last and Always, 1985

Other
 Possession (sports), control of the ball, generally conveying an opportunity to score
 Possession (video game), a 2000s vaporware title

See also 
 Adverse possession
 Dispossess
 Eviction
 Human possession in science fiction
 Possessed (disambiguation)
 Possession Island (disambiguation)
 Possessive (disambiguation)
 Repossession
 US Possession, soccer club on Réunion Island